Blacc Hollywood is the fifth studio album by American rapper Wiz Khalifa. It was released in the UK on August 18, 2014 and in the US on August 19, by Rostrum Records and Atlantic Records. The album features guest appearances from Ty Dolla Sign, Juicy J, Project Pat, Currensy, Ghost Loft, Chevy Woods, and Nicki Minaj, among others. The album was supported by two official singles: "We Dem Boyz" and "You and Your Friends".

Background
On June 24, 2013, Wiz Khalifa announced the title to his third major label (fifth overall) studio album, called Blacc Hollywood, and this project would be featuring some collaborations from American pop singer Miley Cyrus and his label-mate Juicy J. On June 30, 2014, Khalifa posted his Instagram account, with the cover art and release date for Blacc Hollywood, and he also announced that the album is officially set to be released on August 19, 2014. On May 25, 2014, after posting several "weedmixes" and teasers, and after getting out of jail for the marijuana possession. Khalifa released his twelfth mixtape, titled 28 Grams. In August 2014, in an interview with USA Today, he said that this album will be his best work yet.

Promotion
On February 11, 2014, Wiz Khalifa released the album's lead single, titled "We Dem Boyz". On April 14, 2014, Wiz released the music video for "We Dem Boyz". The song peaking at number 43 on the US Billboard 200 and has since been certified Platinum by the Recording Industry Association of America (RIAA).

On July 15, 2014, the album's first promotional single was released for a song, titled "KK". The song features guest appearances from American Southern hip hop rapper Project Pat and his label-mate Juicy J. On July 15, 2014, the music video was released for "KK" featuring Juicy J and Project Pat.

On July 22, 2014, the album's second official single was released, titled "You and Your Friends". The song featuring guest appearances from his longtime collaborator Snoop Dogg and American singer Ty Dolla Sign. The official music video was released December 23, 2014 and currently has over 64 million views. The song was later certified Gold by the Recording Industry Association of America (RIAA) in June 2016.

On July 28, 2014, the album's second promotional single was released, titled "Stayin Out All Night". The song was produced by Dr. Luke.

On August 5, 2014, the track "Promises", was released as the album's third promotional single. On August 6, 2014, the music video was released for "Promises".

On August 12, 2014, the track "So High" featuring Ghost Loft, was released as the fourth promotional single.

Critical reception

Blacc Hollywood was met with generally mixed reviews from music critics. At Metacritic, which assigns a normalized rating out of 100 to reviews from critics, the album received an average score of 54, which indicates "mixed or average reviews", based on 16 reviews. Luke Fox of Exclaim! said, "Blacc Hollywood, an LP titled like it might bring some overarching theme, is the audio equivalent of the Transformers quadrilogy: a series of in-your-face, mass-appeal blockbusters that lure crowds and teach them nothing." Bruce Smith of HipHopDX stated, "While the misses hold Blacc Hollywood back from being great, Wiz still reminds listeners that regardless of what they’re looking for, he’s capable of providing." Jesse Cataldo of Slant Magazine said, "This sense of puzzled division remains the only really interesting thing about Blacc Hollywood, an album that's remarkable only as a ghostly portrait of a half-formed figure prowling the fringes of success." Jordan Sowunmi of Now said, "Blacc Hollywood peaks when Wiz reverts to the hopeful, aspirational tone that powered his initial rise: the Curren$y-featuring House In The Hills combines an up-by-my-bootstraps narrative with palpable incredulity at his success. It’s the hit-chasing emcee at his most compelling: personal, endearing and undeniably heartfelt."

David Jeffries of AllMusic said, "Stoned immaculate with a self-professed monthly weed bill of ten-thousand dollars, Wiz Khalifa isn't the type of rapper to make clear-headed, well-defined albums, but his fifth studio effort gets back to serious, sullen business often enough that it almost has a theme." Michael Madden of Consequence of Sound stated, "At a time when so many A-list rappers are looking to outdo each other creatively, Wiz is sticking to his guns, and they’re jamming up." Brandon Soderberg of Spin said, "Blacc Hollywood could be worse or lazier or just plain longer, but Wiz is a master of half-assed hedging. You're not going to expect more from him than you get here, and by standing for so little Wiz somehow remains relevant." Evan Rytlewski of The A.V. Club stated, "On “No Gain,” Khalifa misuses his favorite L-word again, insisting, “Man, I work hard, literally,” but there's no evidence of hard work on Blacc Hollywood."

Commercial performance
Blacc Hollywood debuted at number one on the US Billboard 200 chart, selling 90,000 copies in its first week. It serves as Wiz Khalifa's first album to debut at number one on the chart. 
In its second week, the album fell to number six on the Billboard 200, selling 30,000 copies. The album spent three consecutive weeks on the top-ten of the Billboard 200. As of January 2016, the album has sold 327,000 copies. On June 22, 2016, Blacc Hollywood was certified Gold by the Recording Industry Association of America (RIAA).

In Canada, the album debuted at number one on the Canadian Albums Chart, selling 5,300 copies.

In 2014, Blacc Hollywood was ranked as the 93rd most popular album of the year on the Billboard 200.

Track listing
Credit adapted from album's booklet.

Track notes
  signifies a co-producer.
  signifies an additional producer.

Personnel
Adapted from AllMusic.

 Mikely Adam – producer
 Big Jerm – engineer
 Tim Blacksmith – executive producer
 Shari Bryant – marketing
 Nathan Burgess – assistant engineer, guitars, mixing assistant
 Greg Gigendad Burke – art direction, design
 Ned Cameron –  producer
 Mike Caren – A&R
 Cirkut – instrumentation, producer, programming
 Kemion Cooks – producer
 Curren$y – featured artist
 Danny D. – executive producer
 Detail – producer
 Dr. Luke – instrumentation, producer, programming
 Andrew Drucker – engineer
 Will Dzombak – executive producer
 Eric Dan –  mixing
 Dvora Engelfield – publicity
 Mikkel Storleer Eriksen –  engineer, instrumentation
 Finatik 'n' Zac – guitars, keyboards, producer, programming
 Rachael Findlen – assistant engineer
 Lanre Gaba – A&R
 Chris Gehringer – mastering
 Ghost Loft – featured artist, instrumentation, producer
 Clint Gibbs – engineer
 Riggs Morales – A&R
 Brianna Harrison – marketing
 Tor Erik Hermansen –  instrumentation
 Ghazi Hourani – assistant engineer
 ID Labs – producer
 J. Mike – producer
 Jim Jonsin – guitars, keyboards, producer, programming
 Juicy J – featured artist
 Ashley Kalmanowitz – publicity
 Kane Beatz – producer
 Miko Lim – photography
 Rico Love –  producer
 Sydney Margetson – publicity
 Robert Marks – mixing
 Niko Marzouca –  engineer
 Arthur McArthur – producer
 Dijon McFarlane –  producer
 Nicki Minaj – featured artist
 Cameron Montgomery – assistant engineer
 Nas – featured artist
 Ryan Neitznick – guitar
 Ricky P. – producer
 Project Pat – featured artist
 Dana Richard – assistant engineer, mixing assistant
 Terry Richardson – cover photo
 Daniela Rivera – assistant engineer, engineer
 Rmbjustize – producer
 Rick Ross – featured artist
 Nick Ruth –  instrumentation, producer, programming
 ScHoolboy Q – featured artist
 Sledgren – producer
 Snoop Dogg – featured artist
 Stargate – producer
 Brian Sumner – engineer
 Phil Tan – mixing
 Ty Dolla $ign – featured artist
 David Versis – additional production
 Miles Walker – engineer
 Wiz Khalifa – executive producer, primary artist
 Chevy Woods – featured artist
 Natalie Young – A&R
 Gabriel Zardes – engineer

Charts

Weekly charts

Year-end charts

Certifications

Release history

References

2014 albums
Atlantic Records albums
Rostrum Records albums
Wiz Khalifa albums
Albums produced by Jim Jonsin
Albums produced by Juicy J
Albums produced by Dr. Luke
Albums produced by Detail (record producer)
Albums produced by DJ Mustard
Albums produced by Stargate
Albums produced by Kane Beatz